François Chamoux (4 April 1915 – 21 October 2007) was a French Hellenist and archaeologist, a member of the Académie des inscriptions et belles-lettres.

Biography 
Chamoux attended lyceums in Chartres and Metz and the Lycée Henri IV in Paris and studied from 1934 at the École Normale Supérieure and was Agrégé des lettres in classical languages in 1938. After that, he served in World War II (where he received the Silver Croix de Guerre) and in 1941 was severely wounded. Between 1943 and 1948 he was a student at the French School at Athens. Subsequently, he served as an assistant at the University of Lille and the Sorbonne and teacher in a Parisian high school (lycée). In 1952 he was awarded his doctorate at the Sorbonne for his thesis dedicated to Cyren under the Battiadae and the Charioteer of Delphi and was subsequently professor at Nancy and from 1960 to 1983 Professor of Greek literature and civilization at the Sorbonne.

He also wrote overviews for Greek culture and art history and a biography of Mark Antony. He was both an excellent connoisseur of Greek art and ancient Greek poetry (especially epigrams). As Homer connoisseur, he regularly attended the symposia in Chios.

He did a lot of excavations in Greece (already in his time at the École francaise in Athens in the 1940s), among others in Delphi, Thasos, and the colonies of Kyrene in Libya .

From 1981 he was a member of the Académie des Inscriptions et Belles-Lettres and from 1974 to 1987 he was editor of the Revue des Études grecques.

See also

 Mosaics of Delos

Selected publications 
 François Chamoux, Cyrène sous la monarchie des Battiades (« Bibliothèque des Écoles françaises d'Athènes et de Rome », 177), Paris, De Boccard, 1953, 480 p., 28 pl. (thèse).
 
 
 François Chamoux, Marc-Antoine, dernier prince de l'Orient, Paris, Arthaud, 1986.

References

External links 
 François Chamoux on wikisource
 François Chamoux on Encyclopedia universalis
 Chamoux, François (1915-2007) on IdRef
 

French hellenists
Classical archaeologists
French archaeologists
Members of the French School at Athens
École Normale Supérieure alumni
Members of the Académie des Inscriptions et Belles-Lettres
1915 births
People from Mirecourt
2007 deaths
20th-century archaeologists